Pantelis Konstantinidis (born 16 August 1975) is a Greek former footballer. He was born in Florina. Konstantinidis played as a left winger for most of his career, earning the nickname Svouras (spinning top) for his quick dribbling in his youth. During 2010 Konstantinidis took the position of the Technical Director to PAOK, succeeding Zisis Vryzas. He could also play as a defender.

Career
He has played for many clubs in Greece starting his career with AEK Athens in 1993, but did not make a single appearance. He was on loan to AO Kavala for two years. He was given at Apollon Athens as an exchange for the transfer of Demis Nikolaidis to AEK and played there for two seasons.

He signed with PAOK in 1998 and stayed there for four years. He topped his game and made himself steady in the starting eleven as a left winger where the fans loved him. Due to the club's financial problems he was sold to Panathinaikos where he stayed for three years, making over 60 appearances before returning to PAOK in 2005. In his career he made 175 league appearances with PAOK, scoring 25 goals. He also captained PAOK during his second stay in Thessaloniki.

In the summer of 2009, Konstantinidis fell out of favor in coach Fernando Santos' plans, and so signed with OFI, continuing his career for the Cretan side in Beta Ethniki. After the season's end, in which OFI narrowly failed to achieve promotion to the First Division, Konstantinidis decided to retire, aged 35.

Honours
AEK Athens
Alpha Ethniki: 1993–94

PAOK
Greek Cup: 2000–01

Panathinaikos
Alpha Ethniki: 2003–04
Greek Cup: 2003–04

Individual
PAOK MVP of the Season: 2000–01

References

External links

1975 births
Living people
Greek footballers
AEK Athens F.C. players
PAOK FC players
Apollon Smyrnis F.C. players
Kavala F.C. players
Panathinaikos F.C. players
OFI Crete F.C. players
Greece international footballers
Greece under-21 international footballers
Super League Greece players
PAOK FC non-playing staff
Association football wingers
Footballers from Florina